Ornativalva tamariciella is a moth of the family Gelechiidae. It was described by Zeller in 1850. It is found in Italy and Croatia.

The wingspan is about 10 mm. Adults have been recorded on wing in May and June.

The larvae feed on Tamarix species, including Tamarix gallica.

References

Moths described in 1850
Ornativalva